The Singles Collection 1984/1990 is a compilation album covering Scottish pop singer Jimmy Somerville's career in the bands Bronski Beat, The Communards and as a solo artist. It was released in 1990.

Content
The Singles Collection 1984/1990 includes the first four singles by Bronski Beat, released in 1984 and 1985, which feature Somerville as lead singer; following his departure from Bronski Beat the band had three further hits ("Hit That Perfect Beat", "C'mon C'mon" and "Cha Cha Heels") but they are not included on the album as it is intended as a retrospective of Somerville's career. It also includes all eight singles released by The Communards, from 1985 to 1988, plus Somerville's first three singles under his own name (including one duet) from 1989 up to the time of the album's release. The album also contains two new songs—a cover of the Bee Gees' "To Love Somebody", which was released as a single to promote the album, reaching number eight in the UK Singles Chart—and a re-recording of "Run from Love", a track originally included on the 1985 Bronski Beat remix album, Hundreds & Thousands; the new version of the song was later remixed for release as a single in 1991, reaching number 52 in the UK.

Critical reception

Dave Obee from Calgary Herald wrote, "Those glittering disco ceiling balls have all been recycled away, but we've still got Jimmy Somerville. The British singer's soaring vocals give an elegant and emotional feel to the 17 cuts on this compilation of his best work. Yes, it's techno-pop dance music, but Somerville's singing keeps it from sounding stale. The disc includes some of his work with Bronski Beat, including "Smalltown Boy", but the real strength is in the diverse selection of songs Somerville has covered."

Track listing

Production
Adapted from the album's liner notes.
Tracks 1–3, 8, 9, 11, 13 & 16 produced by Mike Thorne
Tracks 4, 7, 10, 12, 14 & 15 produced by Stephen Hague
Tracks 5 & 6 produced by Pascal Gabriel
Track 17 produced by Pascal Gabriel; additional production and mix by Stephen Hague
Photography by Paul Cox
Sleeve design by Peter Barrett and Andrew Biscomb

Charts

Certifications and sales

References

External links
The Singles Collection 1984/1990 at Discogs

Jimmy Somerville compilation albums
Bronski Beat albums
The Communards albums
1990 greatest hits albums
London Records albums
Albums produced by Mike Thorne
Albums produced by Stephen Hague
Albums produced by Pascal Gabriel